Lucky Jokers is a 2011 Malayalam comedy film written by Saju Kodiyan, directed by Sunil, and produced by D. Ramesh Babu under the banner of V. Ravichandran's Aascar Films. The cast includes Anoop Menon, Suraj Venjaramoodu, Jagathy Sreekumar, Ajmal Ameer, Jagadeesh, Harishree Ashokan, Madhu, Janardhanan, Vidisha, Indrans, Jaffer Idukki, Saju Kodiyan and Vadivelu. The film reached theatres on 29 April 2011.

Plot
The story revolves around the attempts of many to somehow get into the costly treasure of diamonds, that is said to be in the famous Vishnu Puram palace, handed over to them by a Nepali king, thousand of years ago. Krishanvarma Thampuran is the current Rajah of the palace. The Prince, who finds to his dismay that the treasure is lost, sets out on an adventurous hunt for an ancestral diamond.

Cast

Soundtrack
"Ennum Ninne Kaanaan" - Alphonse Joseph, Jyotsna Radhakrishnan	
"Madhuram Madhuram" - KJ Yesudas, Sindhu Bhairavi
"Puliyeppole Cheerippaayum" - Uncategorized	
"Vennilaa Thankamani" - Subin Ignatious

Production
Lucky Jokers is the first Malayalam film from Aascar Films. The various locales for the film include Kerala, Nepal and Malaysia.

References

External links
 

2010s Malayalam-language films
2011 comedy films
2011 films
Films scored by Berny–Ignatius
Films scored by S. P. Venkatesh
Films scored by M. Jayachandran
Films directed by Sunil